Vend (Ꝩ, ꝩ) is a letter of Old Norse.

It was related to and probably derived from the Old English letter Wynn of the Runic alphabet (ᚹ) and later the Latin alphabet (Ƿ ƿ), except that the bowl was open on the top, not being connected to the stem, which made it somewhat resemble a letter Y. It was eventually replaced with v or u for most writings.

Vend in Unicode and HTML entities 
The upper and lowercase Vend were standardized in April 2008 as part of the Latin Extended-D block of Unicode 5.1

References

Ꝩ
Palaeographic letters
Latin-script letters
Runology